Hinkle Creek is near Roseburg, Oregon. It is the site of the Hinkle Creek Paired Watershed study, which looks at the effects of logging on watersheds.

References

Rivers of Oregon
Douglas County, Oregon